Banwari Lal Chouksey is an Indian machinist and inventor, known for his innovative engineering ideas. He was born in Ganga Pipaliya, in Bhopal district of the Indian state of Madhya Pradesh and did not have formal education beyond high school level. He started his career with Bharat Heavy Electricals Limited as a mechanical labourer where he rose in ranks to become an engineer. He is reported to have designed alternative spare parts for heavy machinery which saved money for the company and he holds patents for some of his inventions. He is the recipient of the several awards such as Mahatma Jyotiba Phule Samman of the Government of Madhya Pradesh, Vishwakarma Rashtriya Puraskar and Shrambhushan Samman. The Government of India awarded him the fourth highest civilian honour of the Padma Shri, in 2005, for his contributions to Science and Technology.

See also 

 Bharat Heavy Electricals Limited

References 

Recipients of the Padma Shri in science & engineering
Year of birth missing (living people)
People from Bhopal district
Engineers from Madhya Pradesh
20th-century Indian inventors
20th-century Indian engineers
Living people
Indian patent holders